McBride is an unincorporated community located in Jefferson County, Mississippi, United States. A post office operated under the name McBride from 1890 to 1955.

Notes

Unincorporated communities in Jefferson County, Mississippi
Unincorporated communities in Mississippi